Serang–Panimbang Toll Road is a toll road that links Serang with Special Economic Zones of Tanjung Lesung and Ujung Kulon National Park. The toll road is connected with Tangerang-Merak Toll Road. This toll road is built to ease logistics and goods travel from industrial areas in Pandeglang Regency and Lebak Regency all the way to Port of Merak or Port of Tanjung Priok. Section I has been inaugurated by President Joko Widodo on 16 November 2021.

Sections
The toll road is divided into 3 sections, with Section I having already been inaugurated by President Joko Widodo on 16 November 2021, while the remaining sections are currently undergoing land acquisition and construction phase.

Exits

See also
Trans-Java Toll Road

References

Toll roads in Indonesia
Toll roads in Java
Transport in Java
Banten
Serang
Serang Regency
Lebak Regency
Pandeglang Regency